A list of people, who died during the 6th century, who have received recognition as Saints (through canonization) from the Catholic Church:

See also 

Christianity in the 6th century
List of Church Fathers

06
06
Saint